Henry Daniel Cogswell (March 3, 1820 – July 8, 1900) was an American dentist and a crusader in the temperance movement. Cogswell and his wife Caroline also founded Cogswell College in San Jose, California. Another campus in Everett, Washington was later dedicated in his honor.

Life
Born in Tolland, Connecticut, as a youth, he worked in the New England cotton mills and studied by night. He became a dentist in Providence, Rhode Island at age 26. When the California Gold Rush started, the Cogswell family decided to go west. They did not do any mining themselves. He offered dentistry services to miners and invested in real estate and mining stocks, becoming one of San Francisco's first millionaires. A pioneer in his field, Cogswell designed the vacuum method of securing dental plates and was the first in California to perform a dental operation using chloroform.

Philanthropy

Cogswell believed that if people had access to cool drinking water they wouldn't consume alcoholic beverages. It was his dream to construct one temperance fountain for every 100 saloons across the United States, and many were built. These drinking fountains were elaborate structures built of granite that Cogswell designed himself.

Cogswell's fountains are found in Washington, D.C., Tompkins Square Park New York City,  Washington Square, San Francisco Pawtucket, Rhode Island, and Rockville, Connecticut.
Other examples were erected and then razed at: Buffalo, Rochester, Boston Common, (removed 1900) Fall River, Massachusetts, Pacific Grove, California, San Jose, California,  and San Francisco (California and Market Streets). The concept of providing drinking fountains as alternatives to saloons was later implemented by the Women's Christian Temperance Union.

These grandiose statues were not well received by the communities where they were placed. Washington, DC's Temperance Fountain has been called "the city's ugliest statue" and spurred city councils across the country to set up fine arts commissions to screen such gifts.

Although the D.C. statue survived mostly unscathed, the San Francisco one was torn down by "a lynch party of self-professed art lovers" including Gelett Burgess (who was subsequently fired from his job at University of California at Berkeley) and one in Rockville, Connecticut, was thrown into Shenipsic Lake.  In Dubuque, Iowa, a statue of Cogswell that sat in Washington Park was pulled down by a group of vandals in 1900 and buried under the ground of a planned sidewalk.  The next day the sidewalk was poured and the object was entombed. However, when new sidewalks were laid in the early 2000s, the statue was not found.

Death and legacy

Cogswell also designed the statue for his own tomb, a 400-ton granite tower, complete with fountains and statues of Hope, Faith, Charity and Temperance. He is buried in Mountain View Cemetery in Oakland, California.

The diaries of Cogswell and his wife Caroline cover 37 years (1860–1897) and are an unusually long and consistent record of busy personal and financial life in the western United States. They are kept at the Bancroft Library at the University of California, Berkeley.

References

External links

 Cogswell Papers at the Bancroft Library
 Cogswell Family Association
eccentric dentist from San Francisco who made a fortune from real estate and mining stocks, donated a life-sized zinc statue of himself holding a glass of water in one hand
Frederick C. Moffatt, "The Intemperate Patronage of Henry D. Cogswell", Winterthur Portfolio, Vol. 27, No. 2/3 (Summer - Autumn, 1992), pp. 123–143

1820 births
1900 deaths
American dentists
American temperance activists
People from Tolland, Connecticut
People from San Francisco
University and college founders
Activists from California
Drinking fountains in the United States
19th-century dentists